Moacyr Brondi Daiuto, commonly known as Moacyr Daiuto (July 19, 1915 – 1994) was a Brazilian basketball coach, who guided the men's national team to the bronze medal at the 1948 Summer Olympics in London, United Kingdom. As an assistant-coach he led the team to the silver medal at the 1963 Pan American Games in São Paulo. He was born in Altinópolis.

References
Profile of Moacyr Daiuto 
PANATHLON CLUB SÃO PAULO - Atividades / História 

1915 births
1994 deaths
Sportspeople from São Paulo (state)
Brazilian basketball coaches
Sport Club Corinthians Paulista basketball coaches